Tuur Houben (born 12 January 1996) is a Belgian football player who is currently playing for Velm in the Belgian Provincial Leagues.

Club career
He made his professional debut in the Belgian Second Division for Oud-Heverlee Leuven on 12 December 2014 in a game against Antwerp.

References

External links
 

1996 births
People from Sint-Truiden
Living people
Belgian footballers
Oud-Heverlee Leuven players
Challenger Pro League players
MVV Maastricht players
SC Telstar players
Belgian expatriate footballers
Expatriate footballers in the Netherlands
Eerste Divisie players
Association football forwards
Footballers from Limburg (Belgium)
21st-century Belgian people